Obulapuram may refer to one of the following villages in India:

 Obulapuram, Anantapur district, in Andhra Pradesh
 Obulapuram Mining Company, company in Anantapur district
 Obulapuram, Rajanna Sircilla district, in Telangana